Mal Chand is an Indian politician and member of the Indian National Congress. Malchand is a member of the Uttarakhand Legislative Assembly from the Purola constituency in Uttarkashi district.

References 

People from Uttarkashi district
Bharatiya Janata Party politicians from Uttarakhand
Members of the Uttarakhand Legislative Assembly
Living people
21st-century Indian politicians
Year of birth missing (living people)